The TS postcode area, also known as the Cleveland postcode area, (or unofficially as the Teesside postcode area) is a group of 29 postcode districts in northern England for ten post towns. These cover north-east North Yorkshire (post towns Middlesbrough, Redcar, Saltburn-by-the-Sea, Guisborough and Yarm) and south-east County Durham (post towns Stockton-on-Tees, Hartlepool, Billingham, Wingate and Trimdon Station).



Coverage
The approximate coverage of the postcode districts:

|-
! TS1
| MIDDLESBROUGH
| Middlesbrough (town centre)
| Middlesbrough
|-
! TS2
| MIDDLESBROUGH
| St Hilda's, Port Clarence
| Middlesbrough, Stockton-on-Tees
|-
! TS3
| MIDDLESBROUGH
| Middlesbrough's east: Brambles Farm, Thorntree, Park End, North Ormesby, Berwick Hills
| Middlesbrough
|-
! TS4
| MIDDLESBROUGH
| Middlesbrough's centre-east: Grove Hill, Longlands
| Middlesbrough
|-
! TS5
| MIDDLESBROUGH
| Middlesbrough's west: Acklam, Brookfield (part), Linthorpe, Whinney Banks
| Middlesbrough
|-
! TS6
| MIDDLESBROUGH
| Eston, Grangetown, Normanby, Teesville, South Bank
| Redcar & Cleveland
|-
! TS7
| MIDDLESBROUGH
| Middlesbrough's south-east: Marton, Nunthorpe, Ormesby
| Middlesbrough, Redcar & Cleveland
|-
! TS8
| MIDDLESBROUGH
| Middlesbrough's south-west (Coulby Newham, Marton, Hemlington), Stainton, Thornton & Maltby
| Middlesbrough, Stockton-on-Tees
|-
! TS9
| MIDDLESBROUGH
| Great Ayton, Stokesley
| Hambleton
|-
! TS10
| REDCAR
| Redcar (town centre, Coatham, Dormanstown, Kirkleatham, Warrenby)
| Redcar & Cleveland
|-
! TS11
| REDCAR
| Marske, New Marske
| Redcar & Cleveland
|-
! TS12
| SALTBURN-BY-THE-SEA
| Saltburn, Brotton, Skelton
| Redcar & Cleveland
|-
! TS13
| SALTBURN-BY-THE-SEA
| Loftus, Skinningrove, Staithes
| Redcar & Cleveland, Scarborough
|-
! TS14
| GUISBOROUGH
| Guisborough
| Redcar & Cleveland
|-
! TS15
| YARM
| Yarm, Kirklevington, Hutton Rudby
| Stockton-on-Tees
|-
! TS16
| STOCKTON-ON-TEES
| Aislaby, Eaglescliffe, Egglescliffe, Preston-on-Tees (village), Urlay Nook
| Stockton-on-Tees
|-
! TS17
| STOCKTON-ON-TEES
| Brookfield (part), Ingleby Barwick, Thornaby
| Stockton-on-Tees, Middlesbrough
|-
! TS18
| STOCKTON-ON-TEES
| Stockton's east: town centre, Hartburn, Grangefield, Oxbridge, Portrack
| Stockton-on-Tees, County Durham
|-
! TS19
| STOCKTON-ON-TEES
| Stockton's west: Bishopsgarth, Elm Tree Farm, Fairfield, Hardwick, Newtown, Roseworth
| Stockton-on-Tees
|-
! TS20
| STOCKTON-ON-TEES
| Norton
| Stockton-on-Tees
|-
! TS21
| STOCKTON-ON-TEES
| Bishopton, Carlton, Long Newton, Redmarshall, Stillington, Thorpe Thewles,  Sedgefield
| Stockton-on-Tees, County Durham
|-
! TS22
| BILLINGHAM
| Billingham (West), Wolviston, Wynyard 
| Stockton-on-Tees
|-
! TS23
| BILLINGHAM
| Billingham (East)
| Stockton-on-Tees
|-
! TS24
| HARTLEPOOL
| Hartlepool (town centre, marina, Stranton), the Headland
| Hartlepool
|-
! TS25
| HARTLEPOOL
| Greatham, Owton, Rift House, Seaton Carew, 
| Hartlepool
|-
! TS26
| HARTLEPOOL
| Throston, West Park
| Hartlepool
|-
! TS27
| HARTLEPOOL
|  Blackhall Rocks, Blackhall Colliery, Castle Eden, Hesleden, High Hesleden, Hutton Henry
| Hartlepool, County Durham
|-
! TS28
| WINGATE
| Wingate, Station Town
| County Durham
|-
! TS29
| TRIMDON STATION
| Trimdon
| County Durham
|}

Map

See also
Postcode Address File
List of postcode areas in the United Kingdom

References

External links
Royal Mail's Postcode Address File
A quick introduction to Royal Mail's Postcode Address File (PAF)

Postcode areas covering North East England